Patak (also Romanized as Patk; also known as Patak-e Dīnārvand) is a village in Nahr-e Anbar Rural District, Musian District, Dehloran County, Ilam Province, Iran. At the 2006 census, its population was 556, in 109 families.

References 

Populated places in Dehloran County